Megalopyge amitina is a moth of the family Megalopygidae. It was described by Paul Dognin in 1912. It is found in South America.

References

Moths described in 1912
Megalopygidae